Greece–Tunisia relations are foreign relations between Greece and Tunisia. Both countries established diplomatic relations in 1956 when Tunisia received its independence. Greece has an embassy in Tunis, and Tunisia has an embassy in Athens. Both countries are members of the Union for the Mediterranean and the Francophonie. The two countries share a deep and long ancient history with the contacts between Phoenicians and Ancient Carthage towards Ancient Greece and vice versa.

During the COVID-19 pandemic, Greece donated 100,000 vaccines to Tunisia.

See also 
 Foreign relations of Greece
 Foreign relations of Tunisia

References

External links 
 Greek Foreign Affairs Ministry about relations with Tunisia
 Greek embassy in Tunis
  Tunisian Foreign Affairs Ministry about relations with Greece (in French only)

 
Tunisia
Greece